White's Lies is a play written by Ben Andron.

The play began preview showings off-Broadway on April 12, 2010 and officially opened on May 6, 2010. Initial reviews were mixed; the New York Times called it a "crass, charmless vehicle" that "plays like an episode of How I Met Your Mother that would be killed in the writers’ room." while Entertainment Weekly gave it a C rating and said it was "the other kind of bad play — the one that's so ridiculous that you can't help giggling at the gaping, craterlike holes in the story and the cliché-spouting characters running around Manhattan in incredibly fabulous, incredibly impractical, incredibly expensive shoes."

The show closed on June 13, 2010 after 26 previews and 46 regular performances.

Synopsis
Some guys are scared stiff at the prospect of settling down, getting married, having kids...and Joe White is no exception. He’s a divorce lawyer, representing one of his many ex-girlfriends, and above all else, he’s a bachelor who wouldn’t have it any other way. So when his mother desperately wants him to start a family, he’ll do the next best thing: make one up. What could go wrong?

Original cast
Tuc Watkins as Joe White
Peter Scolari as Alan
Betty Buckley as Mrs. White
Christy Carlson Romano as Michelle
Jimmy Ray Bennett as Men
Andrea Grano as Barbara
Rena Strober as Women
Josh Davis understudy

References

2010 plays
Off-Broadway plays
Manhattan in fiction